Achepabanca may refer to:

Places
Achepabanca River, Quebec, Canada
Achepabanca River North-East, a tributary of the Achepabanca River in Quebec, Canada
Achepabanca Lake, in Quebec, Canada